Cassa di Risparmio is the Italian word for savings bank, and may refer to:

Current banks
 Cassa di Risparmio di Asti, also known as Banca di Asti, an Italian bank
 Cassa di Risparmio di Biella e Vercelli, also known as BiverBanca, a subsidiary of Cassa di Risparmio di Asti
 Cassa di Risparmio di Bolzano, Italian name of the savings bank of Bolzano, South Tyrol (Südtiroler Sparkasse – Cassa di Risparmio di Bolzano)
 Cassa di Risparmio di Bra, a subsidiary of BPER Banca
 Cassa di Risparmio di Cento, an Italian bank
 Cassa di Risparmio di Fermo, an Italian bank
 Cassa di Risparmio di Fossano, an Italian bank
 Cassa di Risparmio di Genova e Imperia, known as Banca Carige, an Italian bank
 Cassa di Risparmio di Imola, a brand of Banco Popolare
 Cassa di Risparmio di Lucca Pisa Livorno, a brand of Banco Popolare
 Cassa di Risparmio di Orvieto, a subsidiary of Banca Popolare di Bari
 Cassa di Risparmio di Parma e Piacenza, known as Cariparma or Crédit Agricole Italia, a subsidiary of Crédit Agricole
 Cassa di Risparmio di Ravenna, an Italian bank
 Cassa di Risparmio di Saluzzo, an Italian bank
 Cassa di Risparmio della Repubblica di San Marino, Sammarinese bank
 Cassa di Risparmio di Savigliano, known as Banca Cassa di Risparmio di Savigliano, an Italian bank
 Cassa di Risparmio della Spezia, known as Carispezia, a subsidiary of Crédit Agricole Italia
 Cassa di Risparmio di Volterra, an Italian bank

Defunct banks
 Cassa di Risparmio di Alessandria, a defunct subsidiary of Banca Popolare di Milano
 Cassa di Risparmio di Ancona (?–1989), a predecessor of Cassa di Risparmio di Verona, Vicenza, Belluno e Ancona
 Cassa di Risparmio di Ascoli Piceno, a defunct subsidiary of Intesa Sanpaolo
 Cassa di Risparmio di Biella, a defunct bank, predecessor of Cassa di Risparmio di Biella e Vercelli
 Cassa di Risparmio in Bologna, known as Carisbo, a defunct subsidiary of Intesa Sanpaolo
 Cassa di Risparmio di Calabria e Lucania, a defunct bank, predecessor of Banca Carime
 Cassa di Risparmio di Carpi, a defunct subsidiary of UniCredit
 Cassa di Risparmio di Carrara, a defunct subsidiary of Banca Carige
 Cassa di Risparmio di Cesena, a subsidiary of Crédit Agricole Italia
 Cassa di Risparmio di Città di Castello, a defunct subsidiary of Intesa Sanpaolo
 Cassa di Risparmio di Civitavecchia, a defunct subsidiary of Intesa Sanpaolo
 Cassa di Risparmio di Cuneo, a defunct bank, predecessor of UBI Banca
 Cassa di Risparmio di Fabriano e Cupramontana, a defunct subsidiary of Veneto Banca
 Cassa di Risparmio di Fano, a defunct subsidiary of Credito Valtellinese
 Cassa di Risparmio di Firenze, known as Banca CR Firenze, a defunct subsidiary of Intesa Sanpaolo
 Cassa di Risparmio di Foligno, a defunct subsidiary of Intesa Sanpaolo
 Cassa dei Risparmi di Forlì e della Romagna, a defunct subsidiary of Intesa Sanpaolo
 Cassa di Risparmio del Friuli Venezia Giulia, a defunct subsidiary of Intesa Sanpaolo
 Cassa di Risparmio di Jesi, a predecessor of Banca delle Marche
 Cassa di Risparmi di Livorno, a defunct subsidiary of Banco Popolare
 Cassa di Risparmio di Loreto, a defunct subsidiary of UBI Banca
 Cassa di Risparmio della Marca Trivigiana, also known as Cassamarca, a defunct subsidiary of UniCredit
 Cassa di Risparmio di Padova e Rovigo, former name of Cassa di Risparmio del Veneto, a defunct subsidiary of Intesa Sanpaolo
 Cassa di Risparmio di Perugia, former name of Banca dell'Umbria, a defunct subsidiary of UniCredit
 Cassa di Risparmio di Pescara e Loreto Aprutino, known as Banca Caripe, a defunct subsidiary of Banca Popolare di Bari
 Cassa di Risparmio di Piacenza e Vigevano, a defunct bank that merged with Cariparma
 Cassa di Risparmio di Pisa, a defunct subsidiary of Banco Popolare
 Cassa di Risparmio di Pistoia e della Lucchesia, also known as C.R. di Pistoia e Pescia, a defunct subsidiary of Intesa Sanpaolo
 Cassa di Risparmio di Prato, a defunct subsidiary of Banca Popolare di Vicenza
 Cassa di Risparmio della Provincia dell'Aquila, a defunct subsidiary of Banca Popolare dell'Emilia Romagna
 Cassa di Risparmio della Provincia di Teramo, known as Banca Tercas, a defunct subsidiary of Banca Popolare di Bari
 Cassa di Risparmio della Provincia di Viterbo, a defunct subsidiary of Intesa Sanpaolo
 Cassa di Risparmio delle Provincie Lombarde, a defunct bank, predecessor of Intesa Sanpaolo
 Cassa di Risparmio di Reggio Emilia, a defunct bank, predecessor of Bipop Carire
 Cassa di Risparmio di Rieti, a defunct subsidiary of Intesa Sanpaolo
 Cassa di Risparmio di Rimini, known as Banca Carim, a subsidiary of Crédit Agricole Italia
 Cassa di Risparmio di Roma, a defunct bank, predecessor of Banca di Roma
 Cassa di Risparmio di San Miniato, a subsidiary of Crédit Agricole Italia
 Cassa di Risparmio di Torino, a defunct bank, predecessor of UniCredit
 Cassa di Risparmio di Tortona, a defunct subsidiary of UBI Banca
 Cassa di Risparmio di Trieste, a defunct subsidiary of UniCredit
 Casse di Risparmio dell'Umbria, a defunct subsidiary of Intesa Sanpaolo
 Cassa di Risparmio di Venezia, a defunct subsidiary of Intesa Sanpaolo
 Cassa di Risparmio di Vercelli, a defunct bank, predecessor of Cassa di Risparmio di Biella e Vercelli
 Cassa di Risparmio di Verona, Vicenza, Belluno e Ancona, a defunct bank, predecessor of UniCredit
 Cassa di Risparmio di Vignola, known as Banca CRV, a defunct subsidiary of Banca Popolare dell'Emilia Romagna
 Banca del Monte e Cassa di Risparmio Faenza, a defunct bank, predecessor of Banca di Romagna
 Sicilcassa, also known as Cassa Centrale di Risparmio Vittorio Emanuele per le Province Siciliane, a defunct subsidiary of Banco di Sicilia, (now part of UniCredit)
 Nuova Cassa di Risparmio di Chieti, successor of Cassa di Risparmio della Provincia di Chieti, a defunct subsidiary of UBI Banca
 Nuova Cassa di Risparmio di Ferrara, a subsidiary of BPER Banca

Banking foundations
Fondazione Cassa di Risparmio were the former owners of the savings banks, due to a legislation in 1990
 Ente Cassa di Risparmio di Firenze, the original shareholder of Banca CR Firenze, now a minority shareholder of Intesa Sanpaolo
 Fondazione Carige, the original shareholder of Cassa di Risparmio di Genova e Imperia (Carige)
 Fondazione Cariparo, the original shareholder of  Cassa di Risparmio di Padova e Rovigo (Cariparo), now a minority shareholder of Intesa Sanpaolo
 Fondazione Cariplo, the original shareholder of Cassa di Risparmio delle Provincie Lombarde (Cariplo), now a minority shareholder of Intesa Sanpaolo
 Fondazione Carisbo, the original shareholder of Cassa di Risparmio in Bologna (Carisbo), now a minority shareholder of Intesa Sanpaolo
 Fondazione Carispaq, the original shareholder of Cassa di Risparmio della Provincia dell'Aquila (Carispaq), now a minority shareholder of Banca Popolare dell'Emilia Romagna
 Fondazione Cariverona, the original shareholder of Cassa di Risparmio di Verona, Vicenza, Belluno e Ancona (Cariverona), now a minority shareholder of UniCredit
 Fondazione CRT, the original shareholder of Cassa di Risparmio di Torino (Banca CRT), now a minority shareholder of UniCredit
 Fondazione Manodori, the original shareholder of Cassa di Risparmio di Reggio Emilia (Carire), now a minority shareholder of UniCredit
 Fondazione Pisa, the original shareholder of Cassa di Risparmio di Pisa
 Fondazione Roma, the original shareholder of Cassa di Risparmio di Roma
 Fondazione di Piacenza e Vigevano, the original shareholder of Cassa di Risparmio di Piacenza e Vigevano

Arts
 Art collection of Fondazione Cariplo (Cassa di Risparmio delle Provincie Lombarde)
 Art collection of Fondazione Cassa di Risparmio di Cesena
 Art collection of Fondazione Cassa di Risparmio di Fano
 Art collection of Fondazione Cassa di Risparmio di Lucca
 Art collection of Fondazione Cassa di Risparmio di Perugia
 Art collection of Fondazione Manodori (Fondazione Cassa di Risparmio di Reggio Emilia – Pietro Manodori)
 Prize Cento, a literature prize

Buildings
 Palazzo di Residenza della Cassa di Risparmio in Bologna

Sports
 Alessandria Challenger, was known as Trofeo Cassa di Risparmio Alessandria, tennis tournament sponsored by Cassa di Risparmio Alessandria
 Bologna Outdoor, was known as Grand Prix Citta di Bologna Cassa di Risparmio, tennis tournament sponsored by Cassa di Risparmio si Bologna (Carisbo)
 San Benedetto Tennis Cup was known as Carisap Tennis Cup, tennis tournament sponsored by Cassa di Risparmio di Ascoli (Carisap)

See also
 Associazione di Fondazioni e di Casse di Risparmio S.p.A.